23 fencers from 7 nations competed in the amateur sabre competition. The event was won by Georges de la Falaise of France, with his countryman Léon Thiébaut placing second. Austrian Siegfried Flesch was third.

Background

This was the second appearance of the event, which is the only fencing event to have been held at every Summer Olympics. The competition had a much smaller, yet also more international, field than the other 1900 fencing events; less than half of the entrants were French.

France, Germany, Hungary, Italy, Spain, and Switzerland all made their debut in the men's sabre. Austria was the only nation to have competed at both the 1896 and 1900 appearances of the event.

Competition format

The event used a three-round format (quarterfinals, semifinals, final). Each round used round-robin pool play with actual results counting toward placement (as opposed to foil, which had multiple rounds of jury selection rather than results being used). Standard sabre rules were used, except that the target area was the entire body (rather than being limited to above the waist).

 Quarterfinals: The 23 fencers competed in four round-robin pools of 5 or 6 fencers each. The top four in each pool advanced to the semifinals. (Because of withdrawals, the fifth-placed fencer in two of the pools advanced).
 Semifinals: The 16 fencers from the quarterfinals were divided into two pools of 8 fencers each. Each pool played a round robin. The top four fencers in each semifinal pool advanced to the final.
 Final: The final pool had 8 fencers.

Schedule

Results

Quarterfinals

The fencers competed in four round-robin pools in the first round on 19 and 20 June. The top four fencers in each pool advanced to the semifinals. Which fencers competed in which pools is unknown.

Semifinals

The 16 remaining fencers were divided into two pools of 8. They played round-robin tournaments on 22 June, with four advancing from each pool to the final.

Semifinal A

Semifinal B

Final

The final was a round-robin among the 8 remaining fencers.

Results summary

References

Fencing at the 1900 Summer Olympics